The Teio Sho (帝王賞) is a Japanese domestic Grade 1 race. This race began in 1978 as a spring championship race of southern Kanto region horseracing.

It was later opened to JRA horses in 1986. Then, there were few opportunities for JRA and NAR horses to run in the same race, because JRA and NAR were individually operated. This trial promoted an expansion of exchanges between the two organizations. In 1997, it was graded as Domestic Grade 1.

The race is run over 2000 metres at Ohi Racecourse in late June. Hokuto Vega, Admire Don, Vermilion, Espoir City and Hokko Tarumae won the race before winning the JRA Award for Best Dirt Horse.

Most successful horses (2 wins):
 Champion Star – 1988, 1991
 Furioso – 2008, 2010
 Hokko Tarumae – 2013, 2015

Winners since 2001

Past winners
Past winners include:

Horse races in Japan
Dirt races in Japan